Avenir Sportif de Gabès, often referred to as ٍِASG or Zliza is a football club from Gabès in Tunisia. The club was founded in 1978,by M. Hmad Nasfi, a local businessman.  the team plays in red and black colors. Their ground is the Stade du Zrig, which the share with their ultimate rivals Stade Gabèsien or Stayda, which has a capacity of 15,000. The derby between Zliza and Stade Gabèsien is always a big event that enjoys fans of football, even in Gabès or in all Tunisia.

External links
  fan-site of club forza-zleza.com

 
Association football clubs established in 1978
Football clubs in Tunisia
1978 establishments in Tunisia
Sports clubs in Tunisia